Sergey Igorevich Kamenskiy (born 7 October 1987) is a Russian sports shooter. He competed in the men's 10 metre air rifle event at the 2016 Summer Olympics.

References

External links
 

1987 births
Living people
Russian male sport shooters
ISSF rifle shooters
Olympic shooters of Russia
Shooters at the 2016 Summer Olympics
People from Biysk
Olympic medalists in shooting
Olympic silver medalists for Russia
Olympic bronze medalists for Russia
Medalists at the 2016 Summer Olympics
Universiade medalists in shooting
Universiade bronze medalists for Russia
European Games gold medalists for Russia
Shooters at the 2019 European Games
European Games medalists in shooting
Medalists at the 2011 Summer Universiade
Medalists at the 2013 Summer Universiade
Shooters at the 2020 Summer Olympics
Medalists at the 2020 Summer Olympics
Olympic silver medalists for the Russian Olympic Committee athletes
Olympic bronze medalists for the Russian Olympic Committee athletes
Sportspeople from Altai Krai